The Fool (Խենթը, Khenté) is an 1880 Armenian language novel by the Armenian novelist Raffi, one of the best-known novels by one of Armenia's greatest novelists. The plot is based on the last Russo-Turkish War (1877–78), the plot tells a romance set against the background of the divided Armenian nation.

The novel was translated into Russian and published in 2006.

Setting and structure

The novel is set in three districts near the border between the Russian and Ottoman Empires: Bayazit, Alashkert, and Vagharshapat.

The novel opens with four fast-paced chapters describing the Turkish siege of Bayazit, an historic episode from the last Russo-Turkish war. After a harrowing depiction of the battle, its outcome is left in suspense as chapter five suddenly shifts the focus to an earlier time to tell the story of a village  in Alashkert and a romance caught in the treacherous sociopolitical crosscurrents of the war. The succeeding twenty-nine chapters present a rich ethnographic account of country life in this particular region of Western Armenia, while depicting the ideological themes that dominated Armenian life at the time through a set of powerful, competing actors. The novel concludes in Vagharshapat [Etchmiadzin].

Translations

French translation 

The French translation was completed by Mooshegh Abrahamian as Le fou : Conséquences tragiques de la guerre russo-turque de 1877-1878 en Arménie in 2009.

English translations 
Jane Wingate (1950).

Donald Abcarian (2000).

Kimberley McFarlane and Beyon Miloyan (2020).

Literature

References

1880 novels
Armenian-language novels
Armenian novels
Novels set in Armenia
Novels by Raffi
Russo-Turkish War (1877–1878)